In Greek mythology, Plouto or Pluto (Ancient Greek: Πλουτώ means 'wealth') was the mother of Tantalus, usually by Zeus, though the scholion to Euripides' play Orestes 5, names Tmolos as the father.  According to Hyginus, Plouto's father was Himas, while other sources give her father as Cronus.

Notes

References
 Gantz, Timothy, Early Greek Myth: A Guide to Literary and Artistic Sources, Johns Hopkins University Press, 1996, Two volumes:  (Vol. 1),  (Vol. 2).
 Hard, Robin, The Routledge Handbook of Greek Mythology: Based on H.J. Rose's "Handbook of Greek Mythology", Psychology Press, 2004, .
 Hyginus, Gaius Julius, Fabulae in Apollodorus' Library and Hyginus' Fabulae: Two Handbooks of Greek Mythology, Translated, with Introductions by R. Scott Smith and Stephen M. Trzaskoma, Hackett Publishing Company,  2007. .
 Nonnus, Dionysiaca; translated by Rouse, W H D, I Books I–XV. Loeb Classical Library No. 344, Cambridge, MA, Harvard University Press; London, William Heinemann Ltd. 1940. Internet Archive
 Pausanias, Pausanias Description of Greece with an English Translation by W.H.S. Jones, Litt.D., and H.A. Ormerod, M.A., in 4 Volumes. Cambridge, MA, Harvard University Press; London, William Heinemann Ltd. 1918. Online version at the Perseus Digital Library.
 Rutherford, Ian, Pindar's Paeans: A Reading of the Fragments with a Survey of the Genre, Oxford University Press, 2001. .
 Smith, William; Dictionary of Greek and Roman Biography and Mythology, London (1873).
 Trzaskoma, Stephen M., R. Scott Smith, and Stephen Brunet, Anthology of Classical Myth: Primary Sources in Translation, Hackett Publishing, 2004..

Mortal women of Zeus
Anatolian characters in Greek mythology